Nicholas Andre Pinnock (born 2 September 1973) is a British actor. He is known for his roles as lead character Aaron Wallace in the American legal drama For Life and Leon in award-winning Channel 4 drama Top Boy.

Early life and education 
Nicholas Pinnock was born in Balham, London, and spent his early childhood living in Saudi Arabia. On his return to England, he was enrolled at Corona Stage Academy in Hammersmith, London at the age of 12. Whilst there, in his first week, he made his professional debut landing several jobs as a model and child actor in adverts, music videos, film and television. Continuing his vocational training, Pinnock attended a three-year musical theatre course at the London Studio Centre.  After the first year, he decided acting was his first love and in the following years, concentrated on drama and contemporary dance. After graduating, Pinnock joined Lea Anderson's Contemporary Dance Company, the Featherstonehaughs, for several years before pursuing acting full time.

Career 
In 1986, as a child actor, Pinnock starred in the fantasy drama TV serial Mr Magus is Waiting for You, based on the novel by Gene Kemp and following the adventures of four young children who get mixed up with a mysterious magician. A year later he became one of The Pink Windmill Kids on Emu's World on CITV. He then went on to play guest roles in television programmes like Grange Hill, EastEnders, The Bill, Dalziel and Pascoe, Footballers' Wives and Casualty, to name but a few. TV movies followed such as Kingdom of The Blind with Clive Owen and Diamonds with James Purefoy. Theatre work included As You Like It at Stafford Castle at the Staffordshire Shakespeare Festival, followed by working with directors like Kathy Burke in Hampstead Theatre's production of Born Bad and David Grieg and Marisa Zanotti in the Edinburgh Festival official production of the critically acclaimed San Diego and most recently Topdog/Underdog in Glasgow's Citizens Theatre.

Pinnock appeared in his first Hollywood feature film, the 2011 summer blockbuster Captain America: The First Avenger, as a SHIELD Tech. That same year, he went on to play the role of Leon in a four-part award-winning drama Top Boy, which was broadcast on Channel 4 over four consecutive nights from 31 October 2011. After the 2011 England riots in London, Pinnock appeared in the BBC docudrama The Riots: In Their Own Words, The Rioters. The following year, Pinnock portrayed the role of Evan in the ITV drama The Ice Cream Girls. The three-part drama aired in April 2013.

Pinnock portrayed a young Nelson Mandela in the ITV docudrama Mandela: The Prison Years, which aired on 15 December 2013, the day Mandela was buried. Directed by Emmy and BAFTA award-winning director Tom Roberts, the programme charts Mandela's sentencing in 1963, his arrival at Robben Island through to his release on 11 February 1990.

In 2015 Pinnock showcased the role of Frank Sutter in Fortitude on Sky Atlantic. He went on to play Jay "The Sport" Jackson at the Bush Theatre in London, starring in The Royale. The play opened to rave reviews in November 2015. The same year saw the release of Pinnock's next two films, Monsters: Dark Continent, sequel to Monsters in which he plays the role of Forrest, and The Keeping Room, portraying the role of Bill.

Pinnock's next role was as Jason Backland on ITV's crime drama Marcella Series 1 and 2, alongside Anna Friel. The series aired on ITV on 4 April 2016. He then appeared as Ian Shaw in Counterpart, a science fiction thriller first aired on 10 December 2017. In September 2019, Pinnock appeared in the first season of Criminal: UK on Netflix.

In March 2019, it was announced that Pinnock had been cast as lead character Aaron Wallace in For Life, an American legal drama television series created by Hank Steinberg and executive producer Curtis "50 Cent" Jackson. The series was inspired by the life of Isaac Wright, Jr, who was serving a life sentence for a wrongful conviction, but got himself exonerated and became a defense lawyer. The series premiered on ABC on 11 February 2020. and ran for 2 seasons.

It was announced in May 2021, that Pinnock was cast as John Ellis in Django, an upcoming television series for Sky and Canal+, alongside Noomi Rapace, Matthias Schoenaerts and Lisa Vicari.

In December 2022, Pinnock was announced as winner in the Best Actor category at the British Urban Film Festival awards in London.

Charity work 
Pinnock is an ambassador for the mental health charity, Mind UK.

Filmography

Film

Television

References

External links 
 
 

English male actors
British male screenwriters
Living people
1973 births
People from Balham
Black British male actors
English people of Jamaican descent